Vitaliy Ponomar (born 31 May 1990 in Kupiansk, Kharkiv Oblast, Ukrainian SSR) is a Ukrainian footballer played as a forward for Metalist 1925 Kharkiv.

He is a product of the Kupyansk sports school system, and later played for clubs from East and Central Ukraine.

References

External links
 
 

1990 births
Living people
People from Kupiansk
Ukrainian footballers
Ukrainian expatriate footballers
Association football defenders
FC Komunalnyk Luhansk players
FC Shakhtar-3 Donetsk players
FC Poltava players
FC Oleksandriya players
FC Shakhtar Sverdlovsk players
FC UkrAhroKom Holovkivka players
FC Volyn Lutsk players
Ukrainian Premier League players
FC Torpedo Kutaisi players
Erovnuli Liga players
Expatriate footballers in Georgia (country)
Ukrainian expatriate sportspeople in Georgia (country)
Association football forwards
Sportspeople from Kharkiv Oblast